Trapania graeffei is a species of sea slug, a dorid nudibranch, a marine gastropod mollusc in the family Goniodorididae.

Distribution
This species was described from Tergeste, Italy. It does not seem to have been seen since 1879.

Description
This goniodorid nudibranch is translucent white with a rose-red tint and a scattering of brown spots all over the body. The rhinophores and gills are rose-red. "Color pellucide et clare rosaceus, supra punctis et maculis minutis fuscis ubique sparsis; appendices rhinophoriales et branchiales rosaceae."

Ecology
Like other species in this genus Trapania graeffei probably feeds on Entoprocta, which often grow on sponges and other living substrata.

References

Goniodorididae
Gastropods described in 1881